A referendum on joining the European Community was held in Norway on 25 September 1972. After a long period of heated debate, the "no" side won with 54% of the vote. Prime Minister Trygve Bratteli, who had championed a "yes" vote, resigned as a result. This was Norway's second attempt at becoming a member, after having been vetoed by France in January 1963 and again temporarily in 1967, but the first attempt with a referendum on a set of fully negotiated accession terms.

Results

By constituency

See also
1994 Norwegian European Union membership referendum

References

Referendums in Norway
Norway
EC
Referendums related to European Union accession
1972 in international relations
1972 in the European Economic Community
Norway–European Union relations
Norway